Prunus malayana is a species of plant in the family Rosaceae. It is a tree endemic to Peninsular Malaysia.

References

malayana
Endemic flora of Peninsular Malaysia
Trees of Peninsular Malaysia
Least concern plants
Taxonomy articles created by Polbot